The Pathway to the Sun is a novel by Australian author E. V. Timms.

Adaptations
It was adapted into a radio play in 1950 and 1952.

References

External links
The Pathway of the Sun at AustLit

1949 Australian novels
Angus & Robertson books